Rafał Maciej Piszcz (24 October 1940 – 12 September 2012) was a Polish sprint canoer who competed from the mid-1960s to the early 1970s. Competing in three Summer Olympics, he won a bronze medal in the K-2 1000 m event at Munich in 1972.  He was born and died in Poznań.

References
Sports-reference.com profile
Zmarł medalista olimpijski w kajakarstwie Rafał Piszcz, onet.pl, 13 September 2012 (polish)

1940 births
Canoeists at the 1964 Summer Olympics
Canoeists at the 1968 Summer Olympics
Canoeists at the 1972 Summer Olympics
2012 deaths
Olympic canoeists of Poland
Olympic bronze medalists for Poland
Polish male canoeists
Sportspeople from Poznań
Olympic medalists in canoeing
Medalists at the 1972 Summer Olympics